Oloph Eric Fingal Bexell (born 6 June 1947) is a Swedish priest (Church of Sweden) and professor emeritus in church history at Uppsala University.

Biography 
Oloph Bexell received his bachelor of theology in 1974 and was ordained in the Diocese of Växjö the same year. In 1988 he defended his thesis in practical theology, and was employed the same year by the Swedish Church Board for Teaching and Education. He later became a researcher (Bank of Sweden Tercentenary Foundation) in the history of Christianity at Uppsala University from 1989 to 1991. He received his docent certification in church and social sciences in 1990. From 1992 to 2000 Bexell worked as a university instructor in the subject. He became professor of church studies in 2000, and church history from 2006 to 2014, and was during that time subject representative in the subjects. He was subsequently senior professor of church history.

His research focuses on the history of liturgy, homiletics, hymnology and canon law, as well as on biographies, where he has authored a large number of articles in the biographical dictionary Svenskt biografiskt lexikon, around 25 as of 2014. From 1995 to 2005 he was a member of the editorial board for the publication of the book  ('Swedish Church History'), where he wrote volume 7,  ('The era of revival and church renewal', 2003). There and in various essays he has marked pastoral history as an important part of church history. As part of the scientific history project " 1793–2000" ('History of Uppsala University 1793–2000'), he has published  (2021) as a stand-alone volume.

He is an honorary member of the Smålands nation in Uppsala.

Family 
Bexell comes from the Bexell clerical family from Småland and is the son of rural dean  and Märtha Björkman. He is the brother of theologian  and cousin of ethics professor Göran Bexell and author Eva Bexell.

References

Notes

Sources 

 

1947 births
People from Kalmar
Academic staff of Uppsala University
Swedish historians of religion
Living people